Queen-mother, queenmother, or variation, may refer to:

Generally
 Queenmother, an African title
 Queen mother, the role of mother to the monarch

Persons
 Queen Elizabeth The Queen Mother (1900–2002), mother to Queen Elizabeth II 
 Queen Mother Moore (1898–1997), African-American civil rights activist

Mythological
 Queen Mother of the West, a deity in traditional Chinese religion

People
 Queen Mother (Scotland)
 British queen mothers

Places
 Queen Mother Reservoir, England, UK; a water reservoir serving London
 Queen Mother Theatre, Hitchin, Hertfordshire, England, UK
 Queen Mother Hospital for Animals, Pottersbar, Hertfordshire, England, UK
 Queen Mother Pedagogical Institute, Tirana, Albania

Sports
 Queen Mother Champion Chase, a steeplechase race in the UK
 Queen Mother Memorial Cup, a horserace in Hong Kong

Other uses
 The Queen Mother (film), 1916 silent UK film

See also

 Elizabeth the Queen Mother (disambiguation)
 Insu, the Queen Mother, 2011 Korean TV series
 Queen dowager, the widow of the monarch
 
 
 Mother (disambiguation)
 Queen (disambiguation)